Angela Correll is an American author, preservationist, and co-founder of Wilderness Road Hospitality.

Education
Angela has a bachelor's degree in communication from Georgetown College in Georgetown, Kentucky, and a master's degree in library and information science from the University of Kentucky.

Personal life
Angela lives on a farm in Central Kentucky with her entrepreneur husband, Jess.

Career
Angela is the author of the "May Hollow Trilogy," which includes books, Grounded, Guarded, and Granted.

All three books were adapted into plays for Danville, Kentucky's Pioneer Playhouse.

As co-founder along with her husband, Jess, of Wilderness Road Hospitality, have worked to revitalize Kentucky's second oldest city, Stanford, by bringing hospitality businesses to Main Street, a portion of the old Wilderness Road. Wilderness Road Hospitality includes Kentucky Soaps & Such  a goat milk soap factory and retail shop in Stanford, The Inn at Wilderness Road, and the Bluebird, a farm-to-table restaurant in partnership with Executive Chef William Hawkins.

Awards

Grounded, became an Amazon bestseller in 2014 in various categories of inspirational fiction. Groundedthe audiobook, was a finalist for the Audie Award in Inspirational Fiction for 2015, and was nominated for Best Voiceover by the Society For Voice Arts and Sciences in the category of Audiobook Narration – Inspirational/Faith-Based Fiction.

Granted, was awarded the silver medal in Religious Fiction in the 2019 Independent Publisher Book Awards.

Preservation Kentucky, Bruckheimer Award for Historic Preservation in a Rural Community, 2013.

Boyle Landmark Trust Preservation Award, 2014

Bluegrass Trust for Historic Preservation, Barbara Hulette Award, 2014

References

Writers from Kentucky
Living people
Year of birth missing (living people)